This Is Our Music is the fifth album by saxophonist Ornette Coleman, recorded in 1960 and released on Atlantic Records in March 1961. It is the first with drummer Ed Blackwell replacing his predecessor Billy Higgins in the Coleman Quartet, and is the only one of Coleman's Atlantic albums to include a standard, in this case a version of "Embraceable You" by George and Ira Gershwin.

Two recording sessions for the album took place in July and one in August 1960 at Atlantic Studios in New York City. The seven selections for this album were culled from 23 masters recorded over the three sessions. The 16 outtakes from the two July sessions would later appear on the 1970s compilations The Art of the Improvisers, Twins, and To Whom Who Keeps A Record, along with the 1993 box set Beauty Is A Rare Thing, named for a track on this album. Coleman was evidently pleased with the recordings, stating: "In July, 1960... we did thirty tunes in three weeks. All originals. Everything I've ever recorded has been a piece of my own. Until I heard these last tapes, I hadn't realized all the different approaches we'd been developing in the past few months. I think the new albums will give the public and the musicians a more accurate idea of what we're trying to do."

In his liner notes, Coleman was careful to place his music in historical context, writing:

the most important part of our music is the improvisation, which is done as spontaneously as possible, with each man contributing his musical expression to create the form. Now - let's look back. Group improvisation is not new. In early jazz, that kind of group playing was known as Dixieland. In the swing era, the emphasis changed and improvisation took the form of solos based on riffs. In modern jazz, improvisation is melodic and harmonically progressive. Now we are blending the three together to create and give more freedom to the player and more pleasure to the listener.

He also paid tribute to his bandmates, writing: "The experience of playing with these men is unexplainable and I only know that what they know is far beyond a technical explanation for me to convey to you." He concluded the notes by writing: "Since there isn't too much I haven't told you about my music, I really told you about myself through it. The other autobiography of my life is like everyone else's. Born, work, sad and happy and etc. We do hope you enjoy our music."

Reception
In a review for AllMusic, Steve Huey noted that the word "our" in the title of the album "makes clear just how important the concept of group improvisation was to Coleman's goals. Anyone can improvise whenever he feels like it, and the players share such empathy that each knows how to add to the feeling of the ensemble without undermining its egalitarian sense of give and take." He wrote: "All in all, This Is Our Music keeps one of the hottest creative streaks in jazz history going strong." Mark Richardson of Pitchfork stated: "What amazes me about this era of Coleman... is how accessible it is. Back in the day, this band had the intelligentsia calling for Coleman to be fitted for a straightjacket, but to one weaned on the 60s Impulse! catalog, the music sounds joyous, pretty, sensible and sane." He wrote that "[t]he uptempo tracks here are teeming with life" and noted that "sporadic surges in tempo are early experiments in elastic time (a trend that would be explored at great length as the 60s progressed), and these bursts of energy make these pieces seem, well, bountiful." He concluded by stating that, on this album, Coleman's music "just sounds exceptionally fresh and timeless."

Writing for All About Jazz, C. Michael Bailey called This Is Our Music "the militantly expressed jumping-off point... on the way to the epochal Free Jazz", and stated that Coleman "takes a stand here, pushing his vision of musical freedom farther than on any previous release", and "fully leaps the edge of tradition into the chaotic and sublime future he, himself, was forging." According to Bailey, "This is Our Music is Coleman at the point of completely letting go. He and his most sympathetic supporters had evolved through varying musical perimeters to the point that he was prepared to forsake any limiting quantity or quality to his creation and performance. Coleman was introducing what Coltrane would perfect before the end of the 1960s, Coleman playing Vivaldi to Coltrane's Bach."

Pianist and composer Ethan Iverson called the version of "Embraceable You" on the album "probably the ultimate Rorschach test for Ornette’s fans and skeptics", and wrote: "These days I no longer hear the form as constantly getting lost, but instead as a through-composed collective improvisation. Ornette uses pure melody to shape his solo. Haden is right there, abstracting the tune’s changes and humbly serving Ornette’s broken-hearted smear. Blackwell’s mallets are perfect... The searing, Coleman-composed introduction may be better than the Gershwin tune. It’s a performance that requires compassion to be understood."

Jake Cole, writing for Spectrum Culture, stated that "the album's title is a confrontation, a statement of purpose that primed to agitate the hordes of resistors even within jazz circles. Yet the militancy of the album's name and the legacy of Coleman's impact belies the sheer beauty of the compositions." Regarding the faster tempo tracks, he wrote that they are "keen examples of the throughline of jazz history running through Coleman’s work, in particular how heavily it leans on early, Dixieland-style playing. If this is Dixie jazz, though, it’s Dixie of the future. Coleman's saxophone swings and blurts and challenges as Cherry darts around him and sometimes syncs up in terrifying harmony. Throughout, Haden and drummer Ed Blackwell do not so much provide rhythm as yet more instruments in simultaneous collusion and opposition with the others, pushing forward in a composition through attrition." Cole concludes: "Coleman was and remains principally absorbed in the immediacy of human emotion, and his impressionism is still the high-water mark in transposing a feeling."

Track listing
All compositions by Ornette Coleman except "Embraceable You" by George and Ira Gershwin.

Personnel
 Ornette Coleman – alto saxophone
 Don Cherry – pocket trumpet
 Charlie Haden – bass
 Ed Blackwell – drums

References

1961 albums
Atlantic Records albums
Ornette Coleman albums
Albums produced by Nesuhi Ertegun